Moran Creek is a stream in the U.S. state of Montana. It is a tributary to Hay Creek.

Moran Creek was named after an early settler.

References

Rivers of Montana
Rivers of Flathead County, Montana